Somass River is a river on Vancouver Island, in the Canadian province of British Columbia.

The river's name comes from a Nuu-chah-nulth word meaning "washing".

Course
The Stamp River and Sproat River join to form the Somass River, which flows generally southeast and south into Alberni Inlet and the harbour of Port Alberni. The river crosses Highway 4 outside of Port Alberni in Tseshaht First Nation territory. Several kilometres of the lower course of the river are tidal.

Gallery

See also
List of British Columbia rivers

References

Rivers of Vancouver Island
Alberni Valley